Raufeon Stots (born December 16, 1988) is an American mixed martial artist and graduated collegiate wrestler currently competing in the bantamweight division of Bellator MMA, where he is the current Interim Bellator Bantamweight Champion. As a wrestler, he is a two-time NCAA Division II champion. As of December 13, 2022, he is #9 in the Bellator men's pound-for-pound rankings.

Background 
Stots grew up modestly in Houston, Texas with his mother and two brothers. He started wrestling in his junior year at Klein Oak High School in Klein, Texas after the passing of his mother. He then earned a scholarship at Labette Community College and became an All-American with a fourth-place finish in the NJCAA level as a freshman. As a sophomore, he once again qualified for the NJCAA tournament, but did not place. He then transferred to the University of Nebraska-Kearney (NCAA Division II), where he was forced to take a medical redshirt instead of a junior season. When he came back as a junior, he won his first DII title with a record of 30 wins and 6 losses, helping the team reach the team title. As a senior, he compiled his second NCAA title and helped the team win the team championship before graduating.

When transferring from collegiate wrestling to mixed martial arts, Stots found that it wasn't only his work ethic but also the body awareness that helped him move over and adapt to the new sport quickly.

During his transition, fellow Nebraska at Kearney wrestler-turned-MMA Kamaru Usman took Stots under his wing as a mentor. Usman was pushed to Stots by his mother due to the Nigerian roots both wrestlers shared.

Mixed martial arts career

Early career 
Stots got into mixed martial arts after being introduced to the sport by Jens Pulver and Pat Miletich. After turning pro in May 2015, he compiled 8 wins and no losses before competing at a regional event featured on the Lookin' for a Fight show, in an attempt of getting signed by the UFC. After losing the bout, he compiled 4 more wins before getting signed by Bellator MMA.

Stots chose to sign with Bellator out of LFA due to where he saw the promotion heading. Stots said the signing of prospects in the sport instead of former UFC fighters was a big reason, giving him the opportunity to fight some of the best in the world. In addition to that, the Grand Prix tournaments put on by the promotion was another deciding factor for Stots.

Bellator MMA 
In his promotional debut, Stots faced Cheyden Leialoha on December 21, 2019, at Bellator 236. He won the bout by unanimous decision.

Stots faced Cass Bell on July 24, 2020, at Bellator 242. He won the match via submission in the third round.

Stots faced Keith Lee at Bellator 253 on November 19, 2020. He won the fight by unanimous decision.

Stots faced Josh Hill at Bellator 258 on May 7, 2021. He won the bout via unanimous decision.

Stots was scheduled to face Magomed Magomedov on July 31, 2021, at Bellator 263. On July 19, it was announced that the bout was scratched from the event. It was rescheduled for Bellator 264 on August 13, 2021. Stots won the bout via unanimous decision.

Bellator Bantamweight World Grand Prix and Interim Champ 
In the first round bout of the $1 million Bellator Bantamweight World Grand Prix Tournament, Stots was scheduled to face Sergio Pettis for the Bellator Bantamweight World Championship on April 23, 2022, at Bellator 279. However, Pettis was forced to pull out of the bout and the Grand Prix after sustaining an injury that required surgery, resulting in Juan Archuleta taking his place and the bout now being held for the Interim Bellator Bantamweight World Championship. Stots won the bout and became the interim champion after knocking down Archuleta with a head kick and then finishing him on the ground with elbows at the beginning of the third round.

In the semi-finals, Stots faced Danny Sabatello on December 9, 2022 in the main event at Bellator 289. He won the fight via split decision.

In the finals, Stots is scheduled to face Patchy Mix on April 22, 2023 at Bellator 295.

Personal life
Stots has a son, Clarence (born 2018).

Championships and accomplishments

Mixed Martial Arts
Bellator MMA
Bellator Interim Bantamweight World Championship (One time, current)
One successful title defence

Folkstyle wrestling
National Collegiate Athletic Association
NCAA Division II Champion out of University of Nebraska at Kearney  (2012, 2013)
NCAA Division II All-American out of University of Nebraska at Kearney (2012, 2013)
National Junior College Athletic Association
NJCAA All-American out of Labette Community College (2009)

Mixed martial arts record 
 

|-
|Win
|align=center|19–1
|Danny Sabatello
|Decision (split)
|Bellator 289
|
|align=center|5
|align=center|5:00
|Uncasville, Connecticut, United States
|

|-
|Win
|align=center| 18–1
| Juan Archuleta
| KO (knee and elbows)
| Bellator 279
| 
| align=center|3
| align=center|0:16
| Honolulu, Hawaii, United States
|
|-
|Win
|align=center| 17–1
|Magomed Magomedov
|Decision (unanimous)
|Bellator 264
|
|align=center|3
|align=center|5:00
|Uncasville, Connecticut, United States
|
|-
|Win
|align=center| 16–1 
|Josh Hill
|Decision (unanimous)
|Bellator 258
|
|align=center|3
|align=center|5:00
|Uncasville, Connecticut, United States
|
|-
|Win
|align=center|15–1
|Keith Lee
|Decision (unanimous)
|Bellator 253
|
|align=center|3
|align=center|5:00
|Uncasville, Connecticut, United States
|
|-
|Win
|align=center|14–1
|Cass Bell
|Submission (rear-naked choke)
|Bellator 242
|
|align=center|3
|align=center|1:24
|Uncasville, Connecticut, United States
|
|-
|Win
|align=center|13–1
|Cheyden Leialoha
|Decision (unanimous)
|Bellator 236
|
|align=center|3
|align=center|5:00
|Honolulu, Hawaii, United States
|
|-
|Win
|align=center|12–1
|Ralph Acosta
|Decision (unanimous)
|LFA 68
|
|align=center|3
|align=center|5:00
|Dallas, Texas, United States
|
|-
|Win
|align=center|11–1
|Levi Mowles
|Decision (unanimous)
|LFA 55
|
|align=center|3
|align=center|5:00
|Dallas, Texas, United States
|
|-
|Win
|align=center|10–1
|Ryan Lilley
|TKO (punches)
|LFA 48
|
|align=center|3
|align=center|3:00
|Kearney, Nebraska, United States
|
|-
|Win
|align=center|9–1
|Arnold Berdon
|Submission (rear-naked choke)
|VFC 59
|
|align=center|1
|align=center|4:36
|Omaha, Nebraska, United States
|
|-
|Loss
|align=center|8–1
|Merab Dvalishvili
|KO (spinning backfist)
|ROC 59
|
|align=center|1
|align=center|0:15
|Atlantic City, New Jersey, United States
|
|-
|Win
|align=center|8–0
|Rob Emerson
|Decision (unanimous)
|VFC 56
|
|align=center|5
|align=center|5:00
|Omaha, Nebraska, United States
|
|-
|Win
|align=center|7–0
|Jeff Curran
|Decision (unanimous)
|VFC 53
|
|align=center|3
|align=center|5:00
|Waterloo, Iowa, United States
|
|-
|Win
|align=center|6–0
|Charlie DuBray
|Submission (rear-naked choke)
|VFC 52
|
|align=center|2
|align=center|4:52
|Omaha, Nebraska, United States
|
|-
|Win
|align=center|5–0
|William Joplin
|KO (punch)
|VFC 49
|
|align=center|1
|align=center|1:18
|Omaha, Nebraska, United States
|
|-
|Win
|align=center|4–0
|Demetrius Wilson
|Submission (rear-naked choke)
|VFC 47
|
|align=center|3
|align=center|4:45
|Omaha, Nebraska, United States
|
|-
|Win
|align=center|3–0
|Rob Menigoz
|Decision (unanimous)
|UCL: Cut Throath
|
|align=center|3
|align=center|5:00
|Hammond, Indiana, United States
|
|-
|Win
|align=center|2–0
|Mitch White
|Decision (unanimous)
|LFC 43
|
|align=center|3
|align=center|5:00
|Hinckley, Minnesota, United States
|
|-
|Win
|align=center|1–0
|Mike Hebdon
|TKO (punches)
|EC 232
|
|align=center|2
|align=center|0:35
|Clinton, Iowa, United States
|

NCAA record

! colspan="8"| NCAA Division II Championships Matches
|-
!  Res.
!  Record
!  Opponent
!  Score
!  Date
!  Event
|-
! style=background:white colspan=6 |2013 NCAA (DII) Championships  at 149 lbs
|-
|Win
|8–0
|align=left|Jacobd Horn
|style="font-size:88%"|4-3
|style="font-size:88%" rowspan=4|March 8–9, 2013
|style="font-size:88%" rowspan=4|2013 NCAA Division II Wrestling Championships
|-
|Win
|7-0
|align=left|James Martinez
|style="font-size:88%"|MD 12-4
|-
|Win
|6–0
|align=left|Ryan Maus
|style="font-size:88%"|6-1
|-
|Win
|5–0
|align=left|Nate Herda
|style="font-size:88%"|3-2
|-
! style=background:white colspan=6 |2012 NCAA (DII) Championships  at 149 lbs
|-
|Win
|4–0
|align=left|John Hagerty
|style="font-size:88%"|5-4
|style="font-size:88%" rowspan=4|March 9–10, 2012
|style="font-size:88%" rowspan=4|2012 NCAA Division II Wrestling Championships
|-
|Win
|3-0
|align=left|Ky Corley
|style="font-size:88%"|6-1
|-
|Win
|2–0
|align=left|Nate Herda
|style="font-size:88%"|8-5
|-
|Win
|1–0
|align=left|Nathan Link
|style="font-size:88%"|MD 12-4
|-

See also
 List of current Bellator fighters
 List of male mixed martial artists

References

External links

 

Living people
American male sport wrestlers
Amateur wrestlers
1988 births
Nebraska–Kearney Lopers wrestlers
Sportspeople from Houston
University of Nebraska at Kearney alumni
American practitioners of Brazilian jiu-jitsu
American male mixed martial artists
Bantamweight mixed martial artists
Mixed martial artists utilizing collegiate wrestling
Mixed martial artists utilizing Brazilian jiu-jitsu
American sportspeople of Nigerian descent
Mixed martial artists from Texas